The Pointe de Bricola is a mountain of the Swiss Pennine Alps, located south of Les Haudères in the canton of Valais. The east side is covered by the Moiry Glacier.

References

External links
 Pointe de Bricola on Hikr

Mountains of the Alps
Alpine three-thousanders
Mountains of Switzerland
Mountains of Valais